The V.I.P.'s were a British R&B musical ensemble formed in Carlisle, Cumberland, England in late 1963, out of an earlier outfit known as The Ramrods, who had formed in Carlisle in 1960. From a musical reorientation the band changed their name to Art in 1967, and released the album Supernatural Fairy Tales.

Career
The band members at various times were: Mike Harrison (lead vocals) (ex Dino and the Danubes, The Dakotas, The Ramrods); Greg Ridley (bass guitar) (ex Dino and the Danubes, The Dakotas); Frank Kenyon (rhythm guitar) (1963–67) (born 12 October 1945, Carlisle) (ex The Teenages, The Ramrods); Jimmy Henshaw (lead guitar) (1963–67) (born James Henshaw, 20 October 1941, in Newarthill, near Motherwell, North Lanarkshire, Scotland died 1 May 2007, Carlisle) (ex The Ramrods); Keith Emerson (organ) (ex-Gary Farr & The T-Bones) (1966–1967); Luther Grosvenor (lead guitar) (1967); Walter Johnstone (drummer) (1963–67) (born 11 March 1943, Carlisle) (ex The Teenages, The Ramrods); and Mike Kellie (drummer) (1967).

When Emerson left in early 1967 to form The Nice, Harrison, Ridley, Grosvenor and Kellie changed their name to 'Art', and released one album, Supernatural Fairy Tales, produced by Guy Stevens, covering Stephen Stills' "What's That Sound (For What It's Worth)" and Felix Cavaliere's "Come On Up". The group then disbanded, with all four members of the group's final line-up forming Spooky Tooth, with the addition of the American musician Gary Wright, later that same year.

They also participated in a psychedelic album entitled Featuring The Human Host And The Heavy Metal Kids by a collective known as Hapshash and the Coloured Coat, formed by Guy Stevens and an influential British graphic design and avant-garde musical partnership between Michael English and Nigel Waymouth. The musicians involved in that project were Mike Harrison on keys and vocals, Luther Grosvenor on guitars, Greg Ridley on bass and Mike Kellie on drums, as well as Stevens, English and Waymouth. It was the first time that the term 'heavy metal' was ever used in music, even though that album had nothing to do with heavy metal music, being closer to psychedelic music. The album was issued in 1967 by Liberty Records, and contained only five songs from two minutes to more than 15 minutes of psychedelic and almost meditative state kind of music.

Discography

Studio albums
 Supernatural Fairy Tales (Island 1967 - as 'Art')

Compilation albums
The Complete V.I.P.s (2 CDs, 28 tracks) (Repertoire)

EPs
Stagger Lee, Fontana, France
What's That Sound (For What It's Worth), Fontana, France	
I Wanna Be Free, Fontana, France	
Straight Down to the Bottom, Fontana, France

Singles
"Don't Keep Shouting at Me" (UK RCA Victor, 1964)
"Mercy, Mercy" (as The Vipps), U.S. only single, produced by Derek Lawrence)
"Wintertime" (as The Vipps, CBS)
"I Wanna Be Free" (Island)
"Straight Down to the Bottom" (Island)
"What's That Sound (For What It's Worth)" (Island - as 'Art')

References

External links
 The V.I.P.s at Myspace
Cumbrian Bands of the 60s: The Vipps
Greg Ridley
 
  as 'Art'

Musical groups established in 1963
Musical groups disestablished in 1967
1963 establishments in England
1967 disestablishments in England
English rock music groups
British rhythm and blues musical groups
Beat groups
Island Records artists